The Sun Also Rises is a one-act opera by Webster A. Young, based on  Ernest Hemingway's 1926 novel The Sun Also Rises. It is one of a pair of Hemingway works that Young adapted into operas. The opera's libretto is by the composer, and includes direct quotations from the novel. It premiered on May 7, 2000 at the Long Island Opera.

Notes

2000 operas
English-language operas
One-act operas
Operas based on novels
Operas
Operas set in France
Operas set in Spain
Ernest Hemingway